Boo is an object-oriented, statically typed, general-purpose programming language that seeks to make use of the Common Language Infrastructure's support for Unicode, internationalization, and web applications, while using a Python-inspired syntax and a special focus on language and compiler extensibility. Some features of note include type inference, generators, multimethods, optional duck typing, macros, true closures, currying, and first-class functions.

Boo was one of the three scripting languages for the Unity game engine (Unity Technologies employed De Oliveira, its designer), until official support was dropped in 2014 due to the small userbase. The Boo Compiler was removed from the engine in 2017. Boo has since been abandoned by De Oliveira, with development being taken over by Mason Wheeler.

Boo is free software released under the BSD 3-Clause license. It is compatible with the Microsoft .NET and Mono frameworks.

Code samples

Hello world program 
print ("Hello World")

Fibonacci series generator function 
def fib():
    a, b = 0L, 1L   h
    # The 'L's make the numbers double word length (typically 64 bits)
    while true:
        yield b
        a, b = b, a + b

# Print the first 5 numbers in the series:
for index as int, element in zip(range(5), fib()):
    print("${index+1}: ${element}")

See also 

 Fantom
 Apache Groovy
 IronPython
 IronRuby
 Nemerle
 REBOL
 StaDyn

References

External links
 Official website
 WaybackMachine Official website
 The sources of Boo hosted on GitHub
 The documentation of Boo hosted on GitHub
 Visual Boo, for Visual Studio 2010
 BooLangStudio VSIP for Visual Studio 2008
 #develop free IDE for C#, VB.NET and Boo projects on Microsoft's .NET platform
 Boo syntax highlighting for Visual Studio 2010
 How To Think Like a Computer Scientist: Learning to Program with Boo
 Boo Succinctly Revealed
 Bootorial

Programming languages
.NET programming languages
Brazilian inventions
Class-based programming languages
Free compilers and interpreters
Object-oriented programming languages
Procedural programming languages
Programming languages created in 2003
Software using the BSD license
Statically typed programming languages
2003 software